Johanna Mmule Maluleke (died 11 January 2021) was a South African politician from North West. A member of South Africa's African National Congress, she served as a Member of the National Assembly of South Africa from 2009 until 2016, when she resigned to join the North West Provincial Legislature.

Maluleke died in 2021.

References

20th-century births
2021 deaths
African National Congress politicians
Members of the National Assembly of South Africa
People from North West (South African province)
Women members of the National Assembly of South Africa
Members of the North West Provincial Legislature
Women members of provincial legislatures of South Africa